Dark Waters is a 2019 American legal thriller film directed by Todd Haynes and written by Mario Correa and Matthew Michael Carnahan. The story dramatizes Robert Bilott's case against the chemical manufacturing corporation DuPont after they contaminated a town with unregulated chemicals. It stars Mark Ruffalo as Bilott, along with Anne Hathaway, Tim Robbins, Bill Camp, Victor Garber, Mare Winningham, William Jackson Harper, and Bill Pullman.

The film is based on the 2016 New York Times Magazine article "The Lawyer Who Became DuPont's Worst Nightmare" by Nathaniel Rich. The story was first told in the 2007 book Stain-Resistant, Nonstick, Waterproof and Lethal: The Hidden Dangers of C8 by Callie Lyons, a Mid-Ohio Valley journalist who covered the controversy as it was unfolding. Parts of the story were also reported by Mariah Blake, whose 2015 article "Welcome to Beautiful Parkersburg, West Virginia" was a National Magazine Award finalist, and Sharon Lerner, whose series "Bad Chemistry" ran in The Intercept. Bilott also wrote a memoir, Exposure, detailing his 20-year legal battle against DuPont.

Dark Waters had a limited theatrical release on November 22, 2019, by Focus Features, and went wide on December 6, 2019. The film received positive reviews from critics and has grossed over $23 million.

Plot 
In 1999, Robert Bilott is a corporate defense lawyer from Cincinnati, Ohio working for the law firm Taft Stettinius & Hollister. Farmer Wilbur Tennant, who knows Robert's grandmother, asks Robert to investigate a number of unexplained animal deaths in Parkersburg, West Virginia. Tennant connects the deaths to the chemical manufacturing corporation DuPont, and gives Robert a large case of videotapes.

Robert visits the Tennants' farm, where he learns that 190 cows have died of unusual medical conditions such as bloated organs, blackened teeth, and tumors. DuPont attorney Phil Donnelly tells him he is not aware of the case but will help out in any way he can. Robert files a small suit so he can gain information through legal discovery of the chemicals dumped on the site. When he finds nothing useful in the EPA report, he realizes the chemicals might not be regulated by the EPA.

Robert confronts Phil at an industry event, leading to an angry exchange. DuPont sends Robert hundreds of boxes, hoping to bury the evidence. Robert finds numerous references to PFOA, a chemical with no references in any medical textbook. He then discovers that PFOA is perfluorooctanoic acid, used to manufacture Teflon, used in American homes for nonstick frying pans and carpet flooring. DuPont has been running tests of the effect of PFOA for decades, finding that it causes cancer and birth defects, but did not make the findings public. They dumped thousands of tons of toxic sludge in a landfill next to Tennant's farm. PFOA and similar compounds are forever chemicals, chemicals that do not leave the blood stream and slowly accumulate.

Tennant has been shunned by his local community for suing their biggest employer. Robert encourages him to accept DuPont's settlement, but he refuses, wanting justice, and reveals that both he and his wife have cancer. Robert sends the DuPont evidence to the EPA and United States Department of Justice, among others. The EPA fines DuPont $16.5 million.

Robert, however, is not satisfied; he realizes the residents of Parkersburg will suffer the effects of the PFOA for the rest of their lives. He seeks medical monitoring for all residents of Parkersburg in one large class-action lawsuit. However, DuPont sends a deceptive letter notifying residents of the presence of PFOA, thus starting the statute of limitations running, giving any further legal action only 12 months to begin.

Since PFOA is not regulated, Robert's team argues that the corporation is liable, as the amount contaminating the water was six times higher than the one part per billion deemed safe by DuPont's internal documents. In court, DuPont claims that the West Virginia Department of Environmental Protection has recently found that 150 parts per billion are safe (contradicting Dupont's own scientific findings since the 1970's.) The locals protest and the story becomes national news. DuPont agrees to settle for benefits valued at over $300 million. As DuPont is only required to carry out medical monitoring if scientists prove that PFOA causes the ailments, an independent scientific review is set up. To get data for it, Robert's team tells locals they can get their settlement money if/when they donate blood samples for testing. Nearly 70,000 people donate to the study.

Seven years passed with no results from the study. Tennant dies and Robert becomes destitute following several pay cuts, straining his marriage. When Supervising Partner Tom Terp tells him he needs to take another pay cut, Robert collapses, shaking. Doctors tell his wife, Sarah, that he suffered an transient ischemic attack (TIA), brought on by stress. She tells Tom to stop making Robert feel like a failure, since he is doing something for people who need help.

The scientific panel contacts Robert and tells him that PFOA has been linked to two types of cancers and four other diseases. At dinner with his family, he is informed that DuPont is reneging on the entire agreement. Robert has to take each defendant's case to DuPont, one at a time. He wins the first three cases with multimillion-dollar settlements, and DuPont settles the remaining more than 3,500 disease cases for $671 million.

Cast

Production 
On September 21, 2018, it was announced that Todd Haynes would direct the film, then titled Dry Run, from a script by Matthew Michael Carnahan, which would be produced by Participant Media along with Mark Ruffalo. In November 2018, Ruffalo was officially set to star in the film.

In January 2019, Anne Hathaway, Tim Robbins, Bill Camp, Victor Garber, Mare Winningham, William Jackson Harper, and Bill Pullman joined the cast of the film, with Christine Vachon and Pamela Koffler producing under their Killer Films banner. Principal photography began on January 14, 2019, in Cincinnati, Ohio.

William 'Bucky' Bailey, showing the PFOA induced "One nostril and eye defect" discussed in the film as having been found in DuPont's own (and previously hidden) 1981 pregnancy study, appears as himself in the film. His mother Sue worked on the Teflon line in Dupont's facility.

Other real life individuals affected by the environmental catastrophe in Parkersburg and who appear in the film, include: Darlene and Joe Kiger, Crystal Wheeler and Amy Brode (Wilbur's daughters), Jim Tennant (Wilbur's brother), and Sarah and Rob Bilott. Teddy, Charlie and Tony Bilott (Sarah and Rob's sons) also appear in the film.

Release 
The film premiered at the Walter Reade Theater on November 12, 2019. It entered limited release in the United States on November 22, 2019, before going wide on December 6, 2019. The film was released on Netflix in Canada on April 1, 2022, and quickly became the number one movie on Netflix Canada on April 2, 2022.

Reception

Box office
Dark Waters has grossed more than $11.1 million in the United States and Canada, and $11.9 million in other countries, for a worldwide total of over $23.1 million.

In its opening weekend the film made $102,656 from four theaters, a per-venue average of $25,651. It expanded to 94 theaters the following weekend, making $630,000. The film went wide in its third weekend of release, making $4.1 million from 2,012 theaters, and then made $1.9 million in its fourth weekend.

Critical response
On Rotten Tomatoes, the film has an approval rating of 89% based on 236 reviews, with an average rating of 7.30/10. The website's critics consensus reads, "Dark Waters powerfully relays a real-life tale of infuriating malfeasance, honoring the victims and laying blame squarely at the feet of the perpetrators." On Metacritic, the film has a weighted average score of 73 out of 100, based on 38 critics, indicating "generally favorable reviews." Audiences polled by CinemaScore gave the film an average grade of "A−" on an A+ to F scale, while those at PostTrak gave it an average 3.5 out of 5 stars, with 60% saying they would definitely recommend it to a friend.

Economic impact 
The DowDuPont breakup earlier in the year spun off a new DuPont company that continued to lose value throughout the second half of 2019 as investors grew concerned about the potential liabilities related to the old DuPont's fluoropolymer products. When Dark Waters was released on November 12, DuPont's stock price dropped even further by 7.15 points from 72.18 to 65.03. While the portfolio is now a part of Chemours and the companies settled the public health lawsuits referenced in the film, Chemours sued DuPont, alleging that the former parent company saddled it with onerous liabilities when it failed to prepare financial projections in good faith. Chemours estimated that it would need to pay over $200 million to address environmental damages in North Carolina caused by another PFAS manufacturing facility in that region. (The prior settlement in both West Virginia and Ohio cost $671 million, which was split between the two companies.)

DuPont CEO Marc Doyle, executives, and investors argued in internal statements that much of the movie was not based in fact and DuPont was misconstrued to fit the role of the enemy. According to Doyle, limited public statements were made because "in a situation like this, it just doesn’t do you much good to fight it out in the public eye. That would just drive more and more attention to it." Executive chairman Ed Breen would not comment on whether DuPont would take legal action in response to the movie, but he did tell investors, "Obviously, we have a lot of legal folks [that] have been looking at this." Many of the executives with whom this movie draws fault still work, or recently worked, at DuPont. 3M saw little to no change in its stock price the day of the film's release, but it was already experiencing a "difficult year" from "potential liabilities due to possible litigation over previous production of PFAS." 3M's stock price closed at 256.01 on January 28, 2018, and by December 1, 2019, it had fallen to 168.27.

Accolades

Many outlets considered the film was snubbed by the 92nd Academy Awards and 77th Golden Globe Awards, not receiving a nomination.

See also
 Perfluorinated alkylated substances (PFAS)
 Timeline of events related to per- and polyfluoroalkyl substances (PFAS)
 The Devil We Know (2018 investigative documentary)
 Erin Brockovich (film) (2000 biographical legal drama on a similar groundwater contamination incident)
Exposure: Poisoned Water, Corporate Greed, and One Lawyer's Twenty-Year Battle against DuPont (2019 book)
 FSI International, now TEL FSI and Chaska, MN. The merger concluded during the Teflon Lawsuit.
 Fluoroware, previously headquartered in Chaska, Minnesota, manufactures of Teflon Filters and Teflon components for health

References

External links 
 
 
 

2019 films
2010s historical films
2010s legal films
2010s mystery thriller films
2019 psychological thriller films
American mystery thriller films
American psychological thriller films
American historical films
Environmental films
Films about lawyers
Films based on newspaper and magazine articles
Films directed by Todd Haynes
Films produced by Christine Vachon
Films scored by Marcelo Zarvos
Films with screenplays by Matthew Michael Carnahan
Films set in Cincinnati
Films set in Delaware
Films set in West Virginia
Films set in 1975
Films set in 1998
Films set in 1999
Films set in the 2000s
Films set in the 2010s
Films shot in Cincinnati
Films shot in Ohio
Focus Features films
Killer Films films
Participant (company) films
2010s English-language films
2010s American films